Gary Martin DeVore (September 17, 1941 – June 28, 1997) was a Hollywood screenwriter, best known for witty action films and for his own death in 1997.

Early career
DeVore began his writing career in the late 1960s on shows like Chuck Barris' The Newlywed Game, The Steve Allen Show, and Tempo.

Personal life, death, and aftermath 
DeVore married the singer Maria Cole (1969–1978) and the actresses Sandie Newton (1981–1985), Claudia Christian (1988–1992), and Wendy Oates (1996–1997). Briefly, he worked as vice president of production at De Laurentiis Entertainment Group (DEG), before returning to work on films with a three-picture agreement at DEG.

DeVore disappeared in June 1997, while driving at night from Santa Fe, New Mexico to Santa Barbara, California, prompting an extensive search and media speculation. DeVore was working in his office in Santa Fe trying to finish a script. DeVore had recently complained of writer's block, and so had decided to change his environment. When he finally finished the script, DeVore decided to drive home through the Mojave Desert. His wife Wendy was waiting for him at their beachfront house in Carpinteria, California.  When she did not hear from him, she decided to call around 1 am (it was later discovered the call had not been recorded by the telephone company). He answered, but was not very specific on his location. This was the last time Wendy spoke with him.

A year later, he and his Ford Explorer were discovered submerged below a bridge over the aqueduct in Palmdale, California. After police had retrieved the vehicle from the water, it was found that his laptop containing the script (titled The Big Steal) was missing, as was his gun. DeVore's hands were missing; hand bones were found nearby but could not be conclusively identified as DeVore's. The discovery of DeVore's vehicle was considered suspicious, as the aqueduct was searched shortly after his disappearance was reported and nothing unusual was discovered. Police concluded that for DeVore to crash his vehicle in this location meant that he would have had to have driven  against traffic without being seen. This would have been doubly difficult because the vehicle's lights were not switched on. DeVore's death has not been solved to date.

Screenwriter credits 
The Dogs of War (1980)
Back Roads (1981)
Heart of Steel (TV) (1983)
Running Scared (with Jimmy Huston) (1986)
Raw Deal (1986)
Traxx (1988, also producer)
CBS Summer Playhouse: "The Heat" (1988)
Showdown in Little Tokyo (1991)
Passenger 57 (uncredited) (1992)
Pentathlon (1994)

See also
List of solved missing persons cases
List of unsolved deaths

References

External links
 

1941 births
1990s missing person cases
1997 deaths
20th-century American male writers
20th-century American screenwriters
American male screenwriters
Deaths by drowning in California
Formerly missing people
Missing person cases in New Mexico
People from Palmdale, California
Screenwriters from California
Unsolved deaths in the United States